is a Japanese manga anthology of Hiroaki Samura's romantic comedy works published in English by Dark Horse Manga. It collects the five-part series "Ohikkoshi" along with the one-shots "Luncheon of Tears Diary (Vagabond Shōjo Manga-Ka)" and "Kyoto Super Barhopping Journal (Bloodbath at Midorogaike)".

External links
 The Comics Journal review

Dark Horse Comics titles
Kodansha manga
Romantic comedy anime and manga
Seinen manga